Russian athletes competed at the 2022 Winter Olympics in Beijing, China, from 4 to 20 February 2022. On 9 December 2019, the World Anti-Doping Agency (WADA) banned Russia from all international sport for four years, after it was found that data provided by the Russian Anti-Doping Agency had been manipulated by Russian authorities with a goal of protecting athletes involved in its state-sponsored doping scheme. As at the 2018 Winter Olympics, WADA has allowed individual cleared Russian athletes to compete neutrally under the title of "Russian Olympic Committee".

Russia later filed an appeal to the Court of Arbitration for Sport (CAS) against the WADA decision. The Court of Arbitration for Sport, on review of Russia's appeal of its case from WADA, ruled on 17 December 2020 to reduce the penalty that WADA had placed. Instead of banning Russia from sporting events, the ruling allowed Russia to participate at the Olympics and other international events, but for a period of two years, the team cannot use the Russian name, flag, or anthem and must present themselves as "Neutral Athlete" or "Neutral Team". The ruling does allow for team uniforms to display "Russia" on the uniform as well as the use of the Russian flag colors within the uniform's design, although the name should be up to equal predominance as the "Neutral Athlete/Team" designation. Russia can appeal the decision.

On 19 February 2021, it was announced that Russia would compete under the acronym "ROC", after the name of the Russian Olympic Committee. On aftermatch, the IOC announced that the Russian national flag would be substituted by the flag of the Russian Olympic Committee. It would also be allowed to use team uniforms bearing the words "Russian Olympic Committee", or the acronym "ROC" would be added.

On 15 April 2021, the uniforms for the Russian Olympic Committee athletes were unveiled, featuring the colours of the Russian flag. On 22 April 2021, the replacement for Russia's anthem was approved by the IOC, after an earlier choice of the patriotic Russian song "Katyusha" was rejected. A fragment of Pyotr Tchaikovsky's Piano Concerto No. 1 is used.

Triple gold medalist and eight-time medalist Alexander Bolshunov was the closing ceremony flagbearer.

On 19 February, Russian athletes officially set a new record for the total number of medals won, having earned at least 32 and improving on Russia's previous best result in Sochi (30 medals) and USSR's result in Calgary (29 medals). However, in the gold medal count the team finished only ninth with six gold medals.

Competitors
The following is the list of number of competitors participating at the Games per sport/discipline.

Medalists

Alpine skiing

Russia qualified three male and one female alpine skiers, then claimed three additional female quotas during reallocation.

Russian Alpine Skiing Federation announced the 3 men and 4 women participating on 19 January 2022.

Men

Women

Mixed

Biathlon

Based on their Nations Cup rankings in the 2020–21 Biathlon World Cup and 2021–22 Biathlon World Cup, Russian Olympic Committee has qualified a team of 5 men and 5 women.

Russian Biathlon Union announced the 5 men and 5 women participating on 17 January 2022. On 30 January 2022 Valeriia Vasnetsova, who was already in Beijing, was replaced with Evgeniya Burtasova due to positive COVID-19 tests.

Men

Women

Mixed

Bobsleigh 

Based on their rankings in the 2021–22 Bobsleigh World Cup, Russian Olympic Committee qualified 7 sleds. Bobsleigh Federation of Russia announced the competing athletes on 17 January 2022 and full squads of crews on 22 January 2022. On 4 February 2022 Vasiliy Kondratenko and Aleksei Pushkarev were replaced with Alexey Zaitsev and Vladislav Zharovtsev due to positive COVID-19 tests.

Men

Women

Cross-country skiing

Russia qualified the maximum of eight male and eight female cross-country skiers.
Russian Cross-Country Ski Federation announced the 8 men and 8 women participating on 11 January 2022.

Distance
Men

Women

Sprint
Men

Women

Curling

Based on results of the 2021 World Curling Championships and Olympic Qualification Event, Russian Olympic Committee has qualified for men's and women's tournaments. Russian Curling Federation announced the five men and five women participating on 4 January 2022.

Summary

Men's tournament

Russia has qualified their men's team (five athletes), by finishing in the top six teams in the 2021 World Men's Curling Championship.

Round robin
Russia had a bye in draws 5, 7 and 12.

Draw 1
Wednesday, 9 February, 20:05

Draw 2
Thursday, 10 February, 14:05

Draw 3
Friday, 11 February, 9:05

Draw 4
Friday, 11 February, 20:05

Draw 6
Sunday, 13 February, 9:05

Draw 8
Monday, 14 February, 14:05

Draw 9
Tuesday, 15 February, 9:05

Draw 10
Tuesday, 15 February, 20:05

Draw 11
Wednesday, 16 February, 14:05

Women's tournament

Russia has qualified their women's team (five athletes), by finishing in the top six teams in the 2021 World Women's Curling Championship.

Round robin
Russia had a bye in draws 2, 6 and 10.

Draw 1
Thursday, 10 February, 9:05

Draw 3
Friday, 11 February, 14:05

Draw 4
Saturday, 12 February, 9:05

Draw 5
Saturday, 12 February, 20:05

Draw 7
Monday, 14 February, 9:05

Draw 8
Monday, 14 February, 20:05

Draw 9
Tuesday, 15 February, 14:05

Draw 11
Wednesday, 16 February, 20:05

Draw 12
Thursday, 17 February, 14:05

Figure skating

In the 2021 World Figure Skating Championships in Stockholm, Sweden, Russia secured three quotas in the women's, pairs, ice dance competitions, and at least two quotas in the men's competition. A third men's quota was secured at the 2021 CS Nebelhorn Trophy. Figure Skating Federation of Russia announced the 9 men and 9 women participating on 20 January 2022. On 25 January 2022 single skater Mikhail Kolyada was replaced with Evgeni Semenenko due to positive COVID-19 test.

Team event

Freestyle skiing

Russian Freestyle Skiing Federation announced the 9 men and 13 women competing on 20 January 2022. 14th woman was announced on 25 January 2022.

Aerials

Big air

Halfpipe

Moguls

Ski cross

Qualification legend: FA – Qualify to medal round; FB – Qualify to consolation round

Slopestyle

Ice hockey

Russia has qualified 25 male and 23 female competitors to the ice hockey tournaments as part of their two teams.

Summary

Men's tournament

Russia men's national ice hockey team qualified by being ranked 2nd in the 2019 IIHF World Rankings.
Team roster

Group play

Quarterfinal

Semifinal

Gold medal game

Women's tournament

Russia women's national ice hockey team qualified by being ranked 4th in the 2020 IIHF World Rankings.

Team roster

Group play

Quarterfinal

Luge 

Based on their rankings in the 2021–22 Luge World Cup, Russian Olympic Committee qualified ten athletes and a relay team. The team consists of three athletes each in the individual events and two doubles sleds. Russian Luge Federation announced the 7 men and 3 women participating on 10 January 2022.

Men

Women

Mixed team relay

Nordic combined

Russian Ski Jumping and Nordic Combined Federation announced the 3 athletes participating on 17 January 2022.

Short track speed skating

Russian athletes have qualified in all three relays, qualifying four men and five women, then claimed one additional male quote during reallocation. Russian Skating Union announced the 4 men and 5 women participating on 12 December 2021 and then announced fifth man on 17 January 2022.

Men

Women

Mixed

Qualification legend: ADV – Advanced due to being impeded by another skater; FA – Qualify to medal round; FB – Qualify to consolation round; AA – Advance to medal round due to being impeded by another skater

Skeleton

Based on the world rankings, Russian Olympic Committee qualified 6 sleds.

On 17 January 2022, Bobsleigh Federation of Russia announced the 6 competing athletes. On 31 January 2022 Vladislav Semenov and Nikita Tregubov, who is the 2018 silver medalist, were replaced with Daniil Romanov and Evgeniy Rukosuev respectively due to positive COVID-19 tests.

Ski jumping

Russian Ski Jumping and Nordic Combined Federation announced 4 men and 4 women participating on 17 January 2022. Fifth man was announced on 25 January 2012.

Men

Women

Mixed

Snowboarding

Russian Snowboarding Federation announced the 6 men and 8 women participating on 20 January 2022.

Big air

Parallel

Slopestyle

Snowboard cross

Qualification legend: FA – Qualify to medal round; FB – Qualify to consolation round

Speed skating 

Russian Olympic Committee earned the following quotas at the conclusion of the four World Cup's used for qualification — 8 men and 8 women, including both teams in the men's and women's team pursuit events. Russian Skating Union announced the participants on 17 January 2022.

Distance
Men

Women

Mass start

Team pursuit

See also
Russian Olympic Committee athletes at the 2020 Summer Olympics

References

Nations at the 2022 Winter Olympics
2022
Winter Olympics